Lee Ki-Soon (born August 15, 1966) is a South Korean team handball player and Olympic champion. She received a gold medal with the South Korean team at the 1988 Summer Olympics in Seoul.

References

External links

1966 births
Living people
South Korean female handball players
Olympic handball players of South Korea
Handball players at the 1988 Summer Olympics
Olympic gold medalists for South Korea
Olympic medalists in handball
Medalists at the 1988 Summer Olympics